Pseudophilautus caeruleus, commonly called blue thigh shrub frog, is a species of frogs in the family Rhacophoridae.
It is endemic to Sri Lanka.

Its natural habitats are subtropical or tropical moist lowland forests and subtropical or tropical moist montane forests.
It was last known to be threatened by habitat loss in 2020.

References

caeruleus
Endemic fauna of Sri Lanka
Frogs of Sri Lanka
Taxa named by Rohan Pethiyagoda
Amphibians described in 2004
Taxonomy articles created by Polbot